Charles Berkeley, 1st Earl of Falmouth (11 January 1630 – 3 June 1665) was an English nobleman and naval officer who was the son of Charles Berkeley (1599–1668) and his wife Penelope née Godolphin (died 1669), of the Bruton branch of the Berkeley family.

He served the exiled Stuart court. His uncle, John Berkeley, 1st Baron Berkeley of Stratton, secured Charles's employment with James, Duke of York until the Restoration. He was a cavalry officer and fought in the French and Spanish armies. Charles was subsequently created Baron Berkeley of Rathdowne, co. Wicklow, Ireland, and Viscount Fitzhardinge of Berehaven, Co. Kerry, Ireland, on 1 July 1663. He was created Earl of Falmouth, in the Peerage of England, on 17 March 1664, and Baron Botetourt of Langport, Somerset on the same day. He was promoted Lieutenant-Governor of Portsmouth and was elected MP for New Romney.

In 1664 he married Elizabeth Bagot, who as the widowed Countess of Falmouth became a mistress to King Charles II of England.

During the Second Anglo-Dutch War he volunteered for service in the Royal fleet.

His boisterous character made him not very well-loved by many, but his loyalty to the Royal family favoured his relationship with the King. Clarendon was amazed at the flood of tears the King shed, when he received the news that Berkeley had been killed.

The poet John Denham was less charitable about the demise of the Earl:
 His shattered Head the fearless Duke disdains  And gave the last first proof that he had brains

References

1630 births
1665 deaths
British Life Guards officers
Earls in the Peerage of England
Fitzhardinge, Charles Berkeley, 1st Viscount
English military personnel killed in action
Charles
Royal Navy personnel of the Second Anglo-Dutch War
Peers of England created by Charles II
Peers of Ireland created by Charles II